Blissfield High School is a public high school serving grades 9–12 in Blissfield, Michigan, United States.

History 

Prior to 1958, the district was served by a series of smaller rural schools. The initial nickname for the school district was the Blissfield Sugar Boys. This name referred to the large sugar beet production in the area. When the current high school opened in the fall of 1958, the name was changed to the Blissfield Royals. Burdett Peebles was the first principal of the new school.

Athletics 
The Blissfield Royals compete in the Lenawee County Athletic Association. The school colors are purple and gold. The following MHSAA sanctioned sports are offered:

 Baseball (boys)
 Basketball (girls & boys)
 Bowling (girls & boys)
 Competitive Cheer (girls)
 Cross Country (girls & boys)
 Football (boys)
 Golf (boys)
 Soccer (girls & boys)
 Softball (girls)
 Track & Field (girls & boys)
 Volleyball (girls)
 Wrestling (boys)

Notable alumni 
Brad Fischer (1978), professional baseball coach and player
Ray Soff (1976), professional baseball player

References

External links 
 Blissfield Schools site for the high school

Public high schools in Michigan
Educational institutions established in 1958
Schools in Lenawee County, Michigan
1958 establishments in Michigan